Osijek Zoo and Aquarium is an  zoo in Osijek, Croatia. It is located on the banks of the Drava river opposite the city of Osijek, and is the biggest Zoo in Croatia.

Director of the zoo is Denis Vedlin.

References

External links 
 
 http://www.osijek031.com/viewtopic.php?p=4748

Zoos in Croatia
Zoo
Zoo